Events in the year 1609 in Scotland.

Incumbents

Monarch – James VI

Events
 Establishment of the titles of Lord Dingwall and Lord Cranstoun, two titles in the Peerage of Scotland
 Passing of the Statutes of Iona

Births
John Gordon, 14th Earl of Sutherland (d. 1679).

Deaths

8 April – Mark Kerr, 1st Earl of Lothian, nobleman and politician (b. 1553)
2 September – Thomas Scrope, 10th Baron Scrope of Bolton (b. 1567)
4 December – Alexander Hume, poet (born c.1560)

Full date missing 
Jean Fleming, noblewoman (b. 1553/34)
Patrick Hume of Polwarth, courtier and makar (born c.1550)
James Hamilton, 3rd Earl of Arran (born c.1532)

References